The Association of British Insurers or ABI is a trade association made up of insurance companies in the United Kingdom.

History
The ABI began in 1985 after several specialised insurance industry trade associations joined to form one trade association for the UK insurance industry (excluding Lloyd's of London), including the British Insurance Association, the Life Offices’ Association, the Fire Offices Committee, the Accident Offices Association, the Industrial Life Offices Association and the Accident Offices Association (Overseas).

The UK insurance industry is the largest in Europe and the third largest in the world.

In 2014, there was a "shock" announcement that Legal & General was leaving as one of ABI's around 300 corporate members, due to ABI's "decision to transfer its investment business to the Investment Management Association." ABI, says the Insurance Journal, warned about modern building materials like external cladding posing a fire risk before the Grenfell Tower Fire. In July 2019 Amanda Blanc stepped down as ABI chair. It still had Huw Evans as director general of ABI. In March 2020, ABI suggested to the press that "most companies would not be covered by a BI policy even in the event of a Government mandated shut down" over Coronavirus. On March 19, 2020, Nicola Sturgeon argued publicly that insurance companies should do more to help with Coronavirus in Scotland and the UK.

Structure
According to the association, it has around 250 companies in membership, which between them provide 90% of domestic insurance services sold in the UK. ABI member companies account for almost 20% of investments in London's stock market. Its members are major tax contributors, paying £10.4 billion in the 2010 / 2011 tax year. The organisation is funded by members' subscriptions.

Its offices are at One America Square, 17 Crosswall, City of London, EC3N 2LB. The ABI employed around 100 people in 2009.

The association is a member of Insurance Europe.

Function
The ABI represents the collective interests of the UK's insurance industry. The association speaks out on issues of common interest, works to inform and participate in debates on public policy issues, and also acts as an advocate for high standards of customer service in the insurance industry.

See also
 Insurance Fraud Enforcement Department, funded by Association of British Insurers
 Trade groups in the United Kingdom
 International Underwriting Association
 Lloyd's of London

References

External links
 ABI main website
 British Insurance Brokers Association

Trade associations based in the United Kingdom
Organizations established in 1985
Organisations based in the City of London
Insurance industry organizations
1985 establishments in the United Kingdom